A formula editor is a computer program that is used to typeset mathematical formulas and mathematical expressions.

Formula editors typically serve two purposes: 
 They allow word processing and publication of technical content either for print publication, or to generate raster images for web pages or screen presentations.
 They provide a means for users to specify input to computational systems that is easier to read and check than plain text input and output from computational systems that is easy to understand or ready for publication.

Content for formula editors can be provided manually using a markup language,e.g. TeX or MathML, via a point-and-click GUI, or as computer generated results from symbolic computations such as Mathematica.

Typical features include the ability to nest fractions, radicals, superscripts, subscripts, overscripts and underscripts together with special characters such as mathematical symbols, arrows and scalable parentheses.

Some systems are capable of re-formatting formulae into simpler forms or to adjust line-breaking automatically, while preserving the mathematical meaning of a formula.

Available systems

See also
 TeX, a typesetting system designed and mostly written by Donald Knuth
 LaTeX, a document markup language and document preparation system for the TeX typesetting program
 MathML, an application of XML for describing mathematical notations and capturing both its structure and content. It aims at integrating mathematical formulae into World Wide Web pages and other documents. It is a recommendation of the W3C math working group

References